Bridget Rose Dugdale (born March 1941), better known as Rose Dugdale, is a former debutante who rebelled against her wealthy upbringing, becoming a volunteer in the militant Irish republican organisation, the Provisional Irish Republican Army (IRA). As an IRA member, she took part in the theft of paintings worth IR£8 million and a bomb attack on a Royal Ulster Constabulary (RUC) station using a hijacked helicopter.

Early life
Dugdale was born into a wealthy English family. Her millionaire father was an underwriter at Lloyd's of London who owned a  estate near Axminster in Devon. The family also owned a house in London near Chelsea Hospital, and Dugdale was educated at the nearby Miss Ironside's School for Girls in Kensington, west London. She was a popular pupil, with fellow pupil Virginia Ironside stating: "Everyone adored this generous, clever and dashing millionaire's daughter, who was life and laughter". After completing her early education Dugdale was sent abroad to attend a finishing school. Then, in 1958, she was presented as a debutante before Queen Elizabeth II at the start of the social season. Her debutante ball was held in 1959, with Dugdale describing it as "one of those pornographic affairs which cost about what 60 old-age pensioners receive in six months".

Later in 1959, Dugdale began reading philosophy, politics and economics at St Anne's College, University of Oxford. While studying there, she began what newspapers would later describe as a "lunge to the left", when she and Jenny Grove, a fellow student, gatecrashed the Oxford Union wearing wigs and men's clothing in protest at the Union's refusal to admit women undergraduates as members, encouraged from the gallery by another student, Sarah Caudwell. After completing her studies at Oxford, she travelled to the United States attending Mount Holyoke College in South Hadley, Massachusetts, where she obtained a master's degree in philosophy, submitting a thesis on Ludwig Wittgenstein. She also studied at the University of London, obtaining a PhD in economics.

Early political activity
By the early 1970s, Dugdale had become politically radicalised due to the 1968 student protests, and she had also been inspired after visiting Cuba. By 1972 she had devoted herself to helping the poor, after resigning from her job as an economist for the government, selling her house in Chelsea, and moving into a flat in Tottenham with her lover, Walter Heaton, who described himself as a "revolutionary socialist". Heaton was a court-martialled former guardsman and militant shop steward who was married with two daughters, and had been imprisoned for several minor criminal offences including burglary, obstructing the police and fraudulent consumption of electricity. Dugdale cashed in her share of the family syndicate at Lloyd's, estimated to be £150,000, and distributed the money to poor people in north London. Dugdale and Heaton were involved in the civil rights movement, and together ran the Tottenham Claimants Union from a corner shop. They had an interest in the civil rights movement in Northern Ireland, and they made frequent trips there to take part in demonstrations.

In June 1973, the couple were arrested after a burglary at the Dugdale family home in Devon. Paintings and silverware valued at £82,000 were stolen, and police believe the proceeds were destined to be sent to the IRA by Heaton. At the trial at Exeter Crown Court Dugdale claimed to have been coerced and pleaded not guilty, and used the proceedings to publicly denounce her family and background. Her father appeared as a witness for the prosecution and was cross-examined by Dugdale, who said to him: "I love you, but hate everything you stand for". The couple were found guilty, prompting Dugdale to address the jury saying "In finding me guilty you have turned me from an intellectual recalcitrant into a freedom fighter. I know no finer title". Heaton was sentenced to six years' imprisonment, and Dugdale received a two-year suspended sentence as the judge considering the risk of her committing any further criminal acts to be "extremely remote".

IRA activity
In the months following the trial, Dugdale travelled to Ireland and joined an IRA active service unit operating along the border between Northern Ireland and the Republic of Ireland. In January 1974, Dugdale and other IRA members, including Eddie Gallagher, hijacked a helicopter in County Donegal in the Republic of Ireland. Dugdale and Gallagher used the helicopter to drop bombs in milk churns on the RUC station in Strabane in Northern Ireland, the first helicopter bombing raid in the history of the British Isles. The bombs failed to explode, and Dugdale became wanted for questioning regarding the bombing with her picture in police stations across Britain and Ireland. A warrant was also issued for her arrest by Manchester Magistrates Court on 23 February 1974 on charges of conspiring to smuggle arms.

On 26 April 1974, Dugdale took part in a raid on Russborough House in County Wicklow, the home of Sir Alfred Beit, 2nd Baronet. Dugdale and three other IRA members forced their way into the house, and pistol-whipped Sir Alfred and his wife before tying and gagging the couple. The IRA members then stole nineteen old masters valued at IR£8 million, including paintings by Gainsborough, Rubens, Vermeer and Goya. The Vermeer taken was Lady Writing a Letter with her Maid, the only Vermeer in private ownership except for one at Buckingham Palace. The IRA members sent a ransom note offering to exchange the stolen paintings for IR£500,000 and the release of Dolours and Marian Price, two sisters convicted of IRA bombings who were on hunger strike in Brixton Prison attempting to secure repatriation to Ireland. The Gardaí started a nationwide hunt for the paintings, and on 4 May they raided a house rented by Dugdale in Glandore, County Cork, and discovered all nineteen paintings in the boot of a car. Dugdale was arrested under Section 30 of the Offences against the State Act, and the next day she was charged in relation to the helicopter attack and the art theft.

As at her previous trial in 1973, Dugdale used the courtroom as a political platform, shouting "The British have an army of occupation in a small part of Ireland—but not for long!" during her arraignment in Dublin. Dugdale's father issued a statement saying: "I don't want to appear hardhearted, but I've done everything I can for her. She knows perfectly well she could turn to me if she wanted to". In Dugdale's submission to the court during her trial she denounced Britain as "a filthy enemy" and stated the Dublin government was guilty of "treacherous collaboration" with England. On 25 June 1974, she was sentenced to nine years' imprisonment after pleading "proudly and incorruptibly guilty", and she gave a clenched fist salute to supporters in the public gallery.

Imprisonment
Dugdale was pregnant with Eddie Gallagher's child when she was imprisoned, and on 12 December 1974, she gave birth to a son, Ruairí, in Limerick Prison. On 3 October 1975, Gallagher and fellow IRA member Marion Coyle kidnapped industrialist Tiede Herrema near his home in Castletroy, a suburb of Limerick. They were traced to a house in Monasterevin, County Kildare, and a two-week siege began. Coyle and Gallagher had demanded the release of Dugdale and two other IRA members, but the authorities refused to grant any concessions. The siege ended on 7 November when Herrema was released, and Coyle and Gallagher were arrested. Gallagher and Coyle were sentenced to twenty years' and fifteen years' imprisonment respectively, and in 1978 Gallagher and Dugdale received special dispensation to marry. The wedding took place on 24 January 1978 inside Limerick Prison, and was the first wedding between convicted prisoners in the history of the Republic of Ireland. Dugdale was released from prison in October 1980.

Later life
After her release from prison, Dugdale was active in the campaign in support of protesting Irish republican prisoners during the 1981 Irish hunger strike. She is a veteran activist in the political party Sinn Féin.

In 2007, she spoke out in support of the Shell to Sea campaign against the proposed construction of a high-pressure raw gas pipeline through Rossport by Shell, saying the Shell contract was invalid and needed "to be renegotiated on behalf of the people of Ireland". She is also a director at Dublin Community Television.

In 2011, she was the honouree at the annual Dublin Volunteers event, which each year acknowledges a person for their contribution to Irish republicanism. In an interview with the republican newspaper An Phoblacht before the event, Dugdale said she believed "the revolutionary army that was the IRA had achieved its principal objective, which was to get your enemy to negotiate with you. They did that with amazing skill and ability, and I can't help but respect what was done in terms of the Good Friday Agreement." On her involvement in the IRA, she added: "I did what I wanted to do. I am proud to have been part of the Republican Movement, and I hope that I have played my very small part in the success of the armed struggle."

In 2012, she was the subject of a TG4 documentary entitled Mná an IRA (Women of the IRA).

Further reading 

 Amore, Anthony M. The Woman Who Stole Vermeer: The True Story of Rose Dugdale and the Russborough House Art Heist. Pegasus Crime, 2020.

References

Sources

Citations

1941 births
Living people
Alumni of St Anne's College, Oxford
Alumni of the University of London
Art thieves
English rebels
British debutantes
Hijackers
Irish republicans
Mount Holyoke College alumni
People from Axminster
Provisional Irish Republican Army members
Republicans imprisoned during the Northern Ireland conflict